Oliver Baker (1856-1939) was an English painter, etcher, designer and silversmith, best known for his role in the development of the Cymric Silverware line for Liberty & Co.

Baker was born in Birmingham, the son of the artist Samuel Henry Baker. He studied under his father, with whom he shared a studio in Edgbaston, and at the Birmingham School of Art. He exhibited at the Royal Academy frequently from 1883 and was elected a member of the Royal Birmingham Society of Artists in 1884.

His younger brother Harold (1860-1942) was a noted photographer.

References

English designers
English silversmiths
1856 births
1939 deaths
Alumni of the Birmingham School of Art